The 2005–06 Minnesota Golden Gophers women's hockey team represented the University of Minnesota in the 2005–06 NCAA Division I women's hockey season. The Golden Gophers were coached by Laura Halldorson and play their home games at Ridder Arena.

Regular season
In her freshman year, Gigi Marvin ranked second on the team in points and first in assists with 30. She tied for fourth in the WCHA in overall scoring and second in assists. She had seven power-play goals, three game-winning goals and one short-handed goal. In addition, she was named the WCHA Rookie of the Week five times. On October 7, 2005, she earned her first career goal on her first career shot in a 3-0 win over Connecticut.
She had a four-game scoring streak from October 14–22. On November 4, she had a career-high five point game in the 9-5 win over Ohio State, including four assists. For her efforts, she was named the WCHA Rookie of the Week. She added three assists in a 5-1 win over Brown on November 12. 
In the Gophers’ 5-0 win over St. Cloud State on January 14, she scored two goals and two assists for four points. She assisted on the game-winning goal in the 1-0 win over Mercyhurst  College on January 21. In early February, Marvin notched two goals and an assist in Minnesota’s 4-3 overtime win over Minnesota State and later earned rookie of the week honor. She contributed on all three goals in the Gophers’ 3-2 win over St. Cloud State on February 17. The week later, she would get five points in the sweep against North Dakota and receive the WCHA Rookie of the Week for the second consecutive week.

Postseason
In the 2006 WCHA playoffs, Marvin made several contributions. She notched three goals and two assists in the WCHA first round against Minnesota State. On March 11, Marvin set up Jenelle Philipczyk for the game-winning goal in the 2-1 win over Minnesota Duluth. She would assist on Allie Sanchez’ power-play goal in the WCHA Championship game against Wisconsin.

Awards and honors
Gigi Marvin, WCHA All-Tournament Team
Gigi Marvin, led WCHA Rookies in scoring
Gigi Marvin, named WCHA Rookie of the Year
Gigi Marvin, All-WHCA Rookie Team
Gigi Marvin, All-WCHA third team selection.

References

External links
Official site

Minnesota Golden Gophers women's ice hockey seasons
Minnesota
NCAA women's ice hockey Frozen Four seasons
Minn
Minne